Olivella pulchella is a species of small sea snail, marine gastropod mollusk in the subfamily Olivellinae, in the family Olividae, the olives.  Species in the genus Olivella are commonly called dwarf olives.
Subspecies
 Olivella pulchella oteroi Bermejo, 1979: synonym of Olivella oteroi Bermejo, 1979
 Olivella pulchella pulchella (Duclos, 1835) accepted as Olivella pulchella (Duclos, 1835)

Description
The length of the shell varies between 9.3 mm and 11.2 mm.

Distribution
This marine species occurs off Senegal.

References

 Mienis H.K. (1980). Remarks concerning Olivella oteroi and several other Olive shells from West Africa. La Conchiglia. 132-133: 9

External links
 Duclos, P. L. (1835-1840). Histoire naturelle générale et particulière de tous les genres de coquilles univalves marines a l'état vivant et fossile publiée par monographie. Genre Olive. Paris: Institut de France. 33 plates: pls 1-12
 Gray, J. E. & Sowerby, G. B. I. (1839). Molluscous animals and their shells. Pp. 103-155, pls 33-34 [pp. 103-142 by J. E. Gray, 143-155 by G. B. Sowerby I. In: The zoology of Capt. Beechey's voyage, compiled from the collections on notes made by Captain Beechey, the officers and naturalist of the expedition during a voyage to the Pacific and Behring's straits in his Majesty's ship Blossom, under the command of Captain F. W. Beechey in the years 1825, 26, 27 and 28. London pp. XII + 186 + 44 pl]

pulchella
Gastropods described in 1835